Kali (Daulat Khan): کالی دولت خان is a village in the Yavatmal district of Maharashtra, India. It is named after Daulat Khan Patel. Kali (DK) is 20 km away from Pusad, which is to the east of Mahagaon. The population of Kali (DK) is around 25,000.

Daulat Khan founded Kali (DK) in the middle of the 19th century. Kali was famous for education at that time. Children from the near-around  villages would come to Kali for education. Today,there are 2 Urdu schools, 4 Marathi schools, 2 Ashram Shala, and One Jr. College in Kali.

Notable features 
Four kilometres from Kali there is a waterfall, known locally as "Bhad bhadi". There is also a mountain known as Shadaval Pahad in between nearest village Hiwari.  "Bhad bhadi" means waterfall looking beautiful nature in that place School trip always visit

Language and culture 
People of different religions and communities live in Kali, including Hindus, Muslims, Buddhist, Banjari and others. The principal languages of Kali (DK) are Hindi Urdu and Marathi, but various other languages are spoken there, including Urdu, Gormati, Banjari.

Agriculture 
Kali is considered a Tribal village, and has many farmers. Major crops include cotton, tur (yellow beans), and jawar. Kali's agriculture suffers because of unavailability of water in most of the village. Kali has a problem with drinking water. Some years ago Laghu Pat Bandhare kalawa stand for this major problem and it was solved with the help of nearby villages grampanchayat. Agriculture is often impacted by droughts, floods, or heavy rains.

Schools 
Z.P. Marathi School
S.N. Urdu High school
V.N. High School and Junior College
Ashram Shala
Alhaj Athar Mirza Ashram Shala
Z.P. Urdu school
 Nalanda English Medium School for Nursery, KG-1, KG-2

Urdu school 

Zilla Parishad Urdu Middle School is a residential academic institution. It was established in 1895 by elders of Kali. The Urdu school is situated at a distance of 0.5 km from Jama Masjid.

The Urdu school has seven classes from standard first to seventh in the Urdu language. Marathi, Hindi, and English are also taught. It provides better quality education to the children of Kali and nearby villages.

Jama Masjid 

Jama Masjid is one of the oldest mosques in Kali. It is a heritage building located in Old Kali.  
The main hall of the mosque is 15 feet high, 40 feet wide, and 75 feet long, and can accommodate five hundred people. 6 arches support the roof of the main hall. The area is about 3500 square feet.

Most of the property was donated to the Masjid by daulat khan, who migrated here after the rebellion of 1857.

Qabristan 

The graveyard in Kali is very old, despite the claim that Daulat Khan founded Kali in the middle of the 19th century, the graveyard includes tombs dating back about 600 years. It is located in the centre of the village. Most of the people of Kali visit the graveyard at "EID" and "Shab-e -barat".

References

Villages in Yavatmal district